The Ministry of Railways (MOR) is a defunct ministry, formerly under the State Council of the People's Republic of China. The last minister was Sheng Guangzu.

The ministry was responsible for passenger services, regulation of the rail industry, development of the rail network and rail infrastructure in mainland China. 

The ministry was also in charge of the operations of China Railway which manages the railway bureaux and companies in mainland China.

On 10 March 2013, it was announced that the Ministry would be dissolved and its duties taken up by the Ministry of Transport (safety and regulation), National Railway Administration (inspection) and China Railway Corporation (construction and management),  in part addressing concerns about calls for independent supervision of the rail industry.

History 
The Ministry of Railways' predecessor was the Qing and the Republican Ministry of Posts and Communications.

Rail bonds 
MOR, acting as a corporation in the debt market, has sold 60 billion yuan of bonds in 2007.

For the year 2009, MOR planned to sell at least 100 billion yuan ($14.6 billion) worth of construction bonds to finance a large expansion of the country's rail network.

Railway bureaus and companies 

There were 16 railway bureaux and 2 railway group companies under the Ministry of Railways. As of 2008, approximately 2 million people worked in the Ministry of Railways.

List of Railway Ministers

See also 

 Ministries of the People's Republic of China
 Ministry of Transport of the People's Republic of China
 National Railway Administration
 China Railway Corporation
 China Railway Museum
 Liu Zhijun

References

External links 
  
 China Academy of Railway Sciences
 National Railway Administration

Railways
 
China
Ministries established in 1949
Defunct government departments of China